St John the Baptist Church is a former Roman Catholic church located on Stirling Terrace in Toodyay, Western Australia, built 186364.

History
Following the move from Old Toodyay to Newcastle, Father Francis Salvado called for tenders to build a new Catholic chapel to replace the Sancta Maria of Old Toodyay.

The foundation stone of the Catholic Church of St John the Baptist was laid in January 1863 by Father Martin Griver.  He was assisted by Fr Francis Salvado, the Parish priest, and Fr Venanzio Garrido from the New Norcia mission.  By Christmas 1864 the church was completed and had been blessed.  The church's transept was used for a time as a school room for Catholic children until 1884 when the Sisters of Mercy came to Toodyay.

In 1920 the west wing was added.  In 1963, a new church with the same name was completed, next to St Aloysius (in the Catholic Precinct grounds), and the older church was de-consecrated and sold into private ownership.

This is a rendered brick and corrugated iron building with tall pointed arch lancet windows. It has pointed pinnacles to the entrance porch and main facade. In the gable end a round window has been incorporated into rendered cross.

References 

Buildings and structures in Toodyay, Western Australia
Roman Catholic churches in Western Australia
Stirling Terrace, Toodyay
Heritage places in Toodyay, Western Australia
Roman Catholic churches completed in 1864
19th-century Roman Catholic church buildings in Australia